Neringa Aidietytė (born 5 June, 1983) is a Lithuanian racewalker, who competes in the 20 km walking event. Her personal record is 1:29:01, reached in 2014. She represented Lithuania at the 2010 and 2014 European Championships in Athletics, 2011 and 2013 World Championship in Athletics and the 2012 London Olympic Games.

Achievements

References

1983 births
Living people
Lithuanian female racewalkers
Sportspeople from Vilnius
Athletes (track and field) at the 2012 Summer Olympics
Athletes (track and field) at the 2016 Summer Olympics
Olympic athletes of Lithuania